is a three-chapter Japanese manga series written and illustrated by Naho Ōishi, based on Akira Toriyama's Dragon Ball. It serves as a what-if spin-off sequel to the 1990 animated television special Dragon Ball Z: Bardock – The Father of Goku. Bardock survives the destruction of his home planet and the genocide of his entire race, having been sent into the past to a strange planet where he battles Frieza's ancestor, Chilled.

The manga was serialized in V Jump in three chapters between June 21 and August 21, 2011. It was adapted into a short anime film by Toei Animation that premiered on December 17, 2011 at Jump Festa 2012. The film was released internationally in October 2012, as a subtitled extra to the Xbox 360 video game Dragon Ball Z: For Kinect.

Plot summary
Bardock, having somehow survived certain death when Frieza obliterated Planet Vegeta, wakes up in a small village house. A purple-colored creature enters the room and introduces himself as Ipana. He tells Bardock that he is on the Planet Plant, which – as the confused Bardock recalls – was the former name of Planet Vegeta before it was annexed by the Saiyans. Suddenly the village comes under attack by henchmen of the space pirate Chilled whom Bardock easily defeats, earning him the gratitude of the villagers. Uninterested in being a hero, he flees to a nearby cave to recover. Ipana's son Berry brings him food and eventually they grow friendly with one another despite Bardock's reluctance.

Chilled learns that his henchmen have been killed and after the villagers fail to find Bardock on Chilled's orders, he and his henchmen start attacking them and destroying the village. Bardock initially refuses to save them but after Berry begs him, he flies to the village and saves Ipana, who was nearly killed by Chilled. Due to the resemblance, Bardock mistakes Chilled for Frieza and attacks him but Chilled proves too powerful. However, after Chilled fires an energy attack at Berry, Bardock becomes enraged and transforms into a Super Saiyan. Chilled attacks Bardock with his energy blasts which have no effect on the Super Saiyan. Chilled launches a final desperate attack in order to destroy the planet, but Bardock's attack overpowers it and sends the mortally wounded Chilled soaring into outer space. The dying Chilled tells his henchmen to warn his family about Super Saiyans.

Centuries later, Chilled's descendent Frieza would destroy Planet Vegeta out of fear that a Super Saiyan of legend would rise to defeat him. Bardock's son, Goku, would assume the Super Saiyan form and defeat Frieza more than twenty years later.

Characters

The father of Son Goku and Raditz, who was thought to be killed by Frieza.

He is the son of the village doctor Ipana, who treats Bardock.

The village doctor, who treats Bardock.

He is an ancestor of Frieza and a space pirate. Toriyama provided the design for Chilled.

Release
Dragon Ball: Episode of Bardock was serialized in V Jump, with the first chapter released on June 21, 2011, the second on July 22 and the third on August 21. On November 21, 2011, it was announced that the manga would be given an anime adaptation by Toei Animation. The short film premiered on December 17–18, 2011 at Jump Festa 2012. Kazuhiko Torishima, Akira Toriyama's former editor and a former editor-in-chief of both Weekly Shōnen Jump and V Jump, served as producer. The movie later received a coupled home video DVD release with Dragon Ball: Plan to Eradicate the Super Saiyans included in the March issue of the magazine Saikyō Jump, which was released on February 3, 2012.

The entire manga was re-printed in the April 2012 issue of V Jump, released on February 21, 2012, with a slightly different ending which follows that of the film. The film was included subtitled in the European and North American exclusive Xbox 360 video game Dragon Ball Z: For Kinect, released in October 2012. The March 2014 issue of Saikyō Jump included a kanzenban version of the 2012 reprint of Dragon Ball: Episode of Bardock.

On June 20, 2018, the Episode of Bardock film was released in France on DVD and Blu-Ray as part of the Golden Box Dragon Ball Z steelbook set published by Kazé. The set also contains Dragon Ball: Plan to Eradicate the Super Saiyans, Dragon Ball Z: Battle of Gods, and Dragon Ball Z: Resurrection 'F'.

References

External links
 
 

2010s animated short films
2011 anime films
2011 manga
Anime short films
Episode of Bardock
Episode of Bardock
Films directed by Yoshihiro Ueda
Films set on fictional planets
2010s Japanese-language films
Manga adapted into films
Shōnen manga
Comics about time travel
Toei Animation films
Shueisha manga